John Tracy may refer to:

Politicians
John Tracy (New York politician) (1783–1864), American politician, Lieutenant Governor of New York
John Tracy (Wisconsin politician) (1852–1931), Irish-born American politician
John Tracy (MP for Bridport), MP for Bridport 1384-1399
John Tracy (MP for Gloucestershire), see Gloucestershire (UK Parliament constituency)

Others
John Tracy, knight at the Siege of Calais
John Tracy (aerospace executive) (born 1954)
John Tracy, 1st Viscount Tracy, Irish peer
John Tracy, 7th Viscount Tracy, (1722-1793), Warden of All Souls College, Oxford
John Tracy (Medal of Honor) (1848–1918), American Indian Wars soldier
John Tracy (director), American television director
John Tracy (Thunderbirds), fictional character from Gerry Anderson's Supermarionation

See also
John Tracey (disambiguation)
John Treacy (born 1957), Irish athlete and Olympic medallist
John Patrick Treacy (1891–1964), American  prelate  of the Roman Catholic Church
John Tracy Atkyns (died 1773), English barrister